Mnichowice may refer to the following places in Poland:
Mnichowice, Lower Silesian Voivodeship (south-west Poland)
Mnichowice, Greater Poland Voivodeship (west-central Poland)